Yechezkel Taub may refer to:

 Yechezkel Taub, founding Grand Rabbi of the Kuzmir Hasidic sect
 Yechezkel Taub of Yablon, the final Grand Rabbi of the Yabloner Hasidic sect